SA is a 2016 Indian Kannada-language romantic thriller film directed by Hemanth Hegde and starring Vijay Suriya, Karthik Jayaram, Samyukta Hornad, and Hemanth Hegde.

Plot
The story takes place in Coorg in the background of a home stay. A personal conflict in the family turns serious when an intruder enters the family. The story has very unusual touch of terror and thriller. However, the strength of the filmmaker is his screenplay and it is well depicted in this movie too. It was in a story for the controversial poster that was set in Bangalore.

Cast
 Vijay Suriya 
 Karthik Jayaram 
 Hemanth Hegde 
 Samyukta Hornad
 Anuradha Mukerjee  
 Doddanna

References

2016 films
Films shot in Karnataka
2010s Kannada-language films